Michael Buncic  is an American discus thrower who is a two time US Olympian and former NCAA record holder in the men's discus throw. Born to Yugoslavian parents he represented the US in international competition. He participated at the 1988 and 1992 Summer Olympics. In addition he competed in three World Track and Field Championships representing the United States, 1991 Tokyo, Japan, 1993 Stuttgart, Germany, and 1995 Goteborg, Sweden.  He is a four time Olympic and World Championship finalist in the Men's Discus Throw.

Buncic had the world's longest Discus Throw for the 1991 season on April 4, 1991, of 227'7" at Fresno, California. He was the US National Champion in 1995. This  US championship followed having previously finished as runner-up a total of six times. He retired from competition in 1996.

Buncic  competed for the University of Kentucky where he was a multiple SEC Champion, record holder, and All-American in the shot put and discus throw. He represented the US in the World University Games twice; 1985, Kobe, Japan; 1987, Zagreb, Yugoslavia.

He was the US National Junior Champion in the Discus Throw in 1981.

He holds a Masters of Science degree in Molecular Biology from San Jose State University.

Buncic is now a human physiology teacher at Wilcox High School in Santa Clara, California.

International competitions

External links
 https://web.archive.org/web/20060110033125/http://www.macthrowvideo.com/downloads/Buncic_01.mpeg
This throw took place at the 1987 Modesto Invitational in Modesto CA. The winning throw, it was measured at 214 feet. https://www.youtube.com/watch?v=r5ok4pPgVYA

1962 births
Athletes (track and field) at the 1988 Summer Olympics
Athletes (track and field) at the 1992 Summer Olympics
American male discus throwers
Olympic track and field athletes of the United States
Living people
Kentucky Wildcats men's track and field athletes
San Jose State University alumni
Sportspeople from Paterson, New Jersey
Track and field athletes from California
American people of Yugoslav descent
Goodwill Games medalists in athletics
Competitors at the 1990 Goodwill Games
Competitors at the 1986 Goodwill Games